is a dam in Fukushima Prefecture, Japan.

Dams in Fukushima Prefecture
Dams completed in 1987